Betri is a village in Bhabua block of Kaimur district, Bihar, India. As of 2011, its population was 4,377, in 811 households.

References 

Villages in Kaimur district